Beate Heieren Hundhammer (born 24 September 1968 in Oslo) is a Norwegian politician for the Conservative Party.

She was elected to the Norwegian Parliament from Buskerud in 2001, but was not re-elected in 2005. She served in the position of deputy representative during the terms 1993–1997, 1997–2001 and 2005–2009.

References

1968 births
Living people
Conservative Party (Norway) politicians
Members of the Storting
Women members of the Storting
21st-century Norwegian politicians
21st-century Norwegian women politicians